Alicia Diana Santos Colmenero (born June 9, 1950), better known as Diana Santos, is a Mexican voice actress who gave the Minnie Mouse's voice into Latin Spanish, the part of Takeshi in the Spanish dubbed version of the 1967–1968 Japanese television program Comet-San. She has also been credited as Ad Santos (with "Ad" being "A.D.", which stands for her initials "Alicia Diana").

Filmography
Bo Peep in Lamp Life (short film) (2020)
Nai-Nai in Abominable (2019)
Joan Thompson in Ordinary Love (2019)
Bo Peep in Toy Story 4 (2019)
Belle in Wreck-It Ralph Breaks the Internet (2018)
Mother in Rapunzel's Tangled Adventure (episode 27) (2017-2020)
Julia Child (TV Chef) in The Boss Baby (2017)
Miss Chicarelli in Kick Buttowski (2010-2013)
 Isabella Garcia-Shapiro (singing voice) in Phineas and Ferb (2007) (Season 1 only) 
 Mini in Cars (2006) 
 Audrey in Home on the Range (2004) 
Minnie Mouse in Mickey's Twice Upon a Christmas (2004)
Belle and Minnie Mouse in House of Mouse (2001-2003)
Belle / Minnie Mouse in Mickey's Magical Christmas: Snowed in at the House of Mouse (2001)
Minnie Mouse in Mickey's Once Upon a Christmas (1999)
Minnie Mouse (1970s-present)
Lucille Vinson in Crazy in Alabama (1999)
Bo Peep in Toy Story 2 (1999)
Belle (speaking voice) in Belle's Tales of Friendship (1999)
Lila Alweather (speaking voice) in Paulie (1998)
Boy in hospital in Babe: Pig in the City (1998)
Belle (speaking voice) in Belle's Magical World (1998)
Belle (speaking voice) in Beauty and the Beast: The Enchanted Christmas (1997)
Felinet in The Adventures of Pinocchio (1996)
 Nerdluck Nawt in Space Jam (1996)
Baloo (cub) and Mowgli in Jungle Cubs (1996-1998)
Bo Peep in Toy Story (1995)
The Hoggetts' Daughter / The Singing Mice / Valda in Babe (1995)
Spanky McFarland in The Little Rascals (1994) (Original Mexican dub)
Sarah Sanderson in Hocus Pocus (1993) (Mexican re-dub)
Jerry and Robyn Starling (singing voice) in Tom and Jerry: The Movie (1992)
Young Ebenezer Scrooge as well as Clara and Beaker in The Muppet Christmas Carol (1992)
Belle (speaking voice) in Beauty and the Beast (1991)
Binkie, Honker, and Tank Muddlefoot in Darkwing Duck (1991)
Edmond in Rock-A-Doodle (1991)
Miss Bianca in The Rescuers Down Under (1990) 
Rebecca Cunningham in TaleSpin (1990) 
Webby in DuckTales the Movie: Treasure of the Lost Lamp (1990)
Miss Piggy in Muppet Babies (1984–1991) and Muppets from Space (1999)
Chip in Chip 'n Dale Rescue Rangers (1989)
Anne-Marie in All Dogs Go to Heaven (1989) (Original Mexican dub)
Young Babar / Young Celeste in Babar: The Movie (1989) (Mexican re-dub) (1994)
Hansel (singing voice) in Hansel and Gretel (1987)
Princess Rosebud in Sleeping Beauty (1987)
Young Snow White in Snow White (1987)
Margaret Krusemark in Angel Heart (1987)
Twinkle in Pinocchio and the Emperor of the Night (1987)
Jeanette Miller in The Chipmunk Adventure (1987) (Original Mexican dub)
Olivia Flaversham / Lady Mouse in The Great Mouse Detective (1986)
Alicia in He-Man & She-Ra: A Christmas Special (1985)
Sunni Gummi / Princess Calla in Disney's Adventures of the Gummi Bears (1985)
Princess Eilonwy / Fairfolk Little Girl in The Black Cauldron (1985)
Mrs. Brisby / Timothy Brisby  in The Secret of NIMH (1982) (Original Mexican dub)
Vixey in The Fox and the Hound (1981)
Smurfette in The Smurfs (1981-1989)
Banjo in Banjo the Woodpile Cat (1979) (Original Mexican dub)
Madame du Barry in Lady Oscar (1979)
Boy (speaking voice) in The Small One (1978)
Pete (speaking voice) in Pete's Dragon (1977)
Elisa in The Wild Swans (1977)
Miss Bianca in The Rescuers (1977)
Fritz in Hans Christian Andersen's The Little Mermaid (1975)
Peter / Clara Sesemann in Heidi (1974)
Maid Marian (speaking voice) in Robin Hood (1973)
Paul Rawlins in Bedknobs and Broomsticks (1971)
Mowgli in The Jungle Book (1967)
Christopher Robin in the Winnie the Pooh featurettes (1966–1974)
Liesl von Trapp (speaking voice) in The Sound of Music (1965) (Original Mexican dub)
Michael Banks / Jane Banks (singing voice) in Mary Poppins (1964) (Mexican re-dub) (1986)
Miles in The Innocents (1961)
Lucky and Penny in One Hundred and One Dalmatians (1961)
Pollyanna Whittier in Pollyanna (1960)
Anne Frank in The Diary of Anne Frank (1959)
Arliss Coates and Lisbeth Searcy in Old Yeller (1957)
Singing Harp (speaking voice) in Fun and Fancy Free (1947) (Mexican re-dub) (1992)
Adult Faline (speaking voice) in Bambi (1942) (Mexican re-dub) (1969)
Vicky Standing in Susannah of the Mounties (1939)
Snow White in Snow White and the Seven Dwarfs (1937) (Mexican re-dub) (2001) (2 loops)
Happy in Kitty Is Not a Cat

Honours and awards
On November 28, 2020, during the 2nd Lavat Awards ceremony held in Mexico City, Diana Santos received an honorary award in recognition for her lifetime work as a dubbing actress spanning 64 years.  The ceremony was broadcast live on the Lavat Awards official website due to the COVID-19 pandemic, as opposed to the previous year.

References 

1950 births
Living people
Mexican voice actresses
Actresses from Veracruz